Oliver von Dohnányi (born 2 March 1955) is a Slovak conductor based in Prague, Czech Republic. He is currently serving as the music director of the Ural Opera House in Yekaterinburg, Russia.

Dohnányi was born in Trenčín, Czechoslovakia (now in Slovakia) and studied violin, composition and conducting at the Prague Academy for Music under Václav Neumann and the University of Music and Performing Arts in Vienna under Otmar Suitner. He made his conducting debut in 1979 with the Slovak Radio Symphony Orchestra in Bratislava. Previously, Dohnányi served as the music director of the Czech National Theatre in Prague, Intendent/Artistic Director of the Opera of the Slovak National Theatre in Bratislava, Intendent/Artistic Director of the Opera of the Moravian-Silesian National Theatre in Ostrava, and principal conductor of the Slovak Sinfonietta.

In 2018, Dohnányi received the biggest Russian theatrical award, The Golden Mask, with the title "Best Conductor".

Dohnányi is also a member of the well-known Dohnányi family, a notable Hungarian family of politicians and musicians.

References

External links
Official web page

1955 births
Slovak conductors (music)
Male conductors (music)
Czech conductors (music)
Hungarian conductors (music)
Hungarian male musicians
Living people
People from Trenčín
Academy of Performing Arts in Prague alumni
Oliver Dohnanyi
University of Music and Performing Arts Vienna alumni
21st-century conductors (music)
21st-century Czech male musicians